"Arsenal De Belles Melodies" (French for "arsenal of beautiful melodies") is the second studio album by Congolese singer Fally Ipupa. It was released on June 22, 2009, and contains 16 tracks. It is the second album by Fally Ipupa to be produced by David Monsoh.
On the album, Ipupa collaborated with Olivia Longott, a former member of 50 Cent's G-Unit musical group, on the song Chaise Électrique and with Krys on the song Sexy Dance.

The album is the second album by Ipupa to go gold for selling over 100,000 copies in less than a month, including 40,000 sales in a week. This was a record for a Congolese artist.

Track listing
2009
Biçarbonate – 9:29
Çadenas – 8:24
Tsho – 6:28
Travelling Love – 8:23
Une minute – 7:24
Délibération – 7:03
Chaise Électrique (feat. Olivia Longott) – 3:55
Nyokalessé – 7:53
Mon amour – 6:15
Çatafalque – 8:03
La jungle – 5:46
Arsenal de belles mélodies – 9:40
5e race – 8:04
Orphelin amoureux – 5:09
Lourdes – 8:46
Sexy Dance (feat. Krys) – 3:21

Singles
 "Chaise Électrique" (2013); music video directed by Charly Clodion
 "Biçarbonate"

References

Fally Ipupa albums
2009 albums